Helena Mathilda Munktell (24 November 1852 – 10 September 1919) was a Swedish composer.

Biography
She was born at Grycksbo in Dalarna County, Sweden.  She was the youngest of nine children of Henrik Munktell (1804–1861) and Christina Augusta Eggertz (1818-1889). Her mother lived separately in Stockholm and after her father died, the family moved there.
Her sister Emma Josepha Sparre (1851–1913)  was a painter.

Munktell studied music at the Stockholm Conservatory with Conrad Nordqvist, Johan Lindegren, Ludwig Norman and Joseph Dente, and then in Vienna with Julius Epstein. She studied both piano and voice, and continued her education in composition in Paris with Benjamin Godard and Vincent d'Indy. Her debut as a composer took place in Sweden in 1885. In the late 1890s, Helena Munktell began to compose music for orchestra. In 1915 she became a member of the Royal Swedish Academy of Music and in 1918 she co-founded the Swedish Society of Composers.

She suffered from eye disease and died at the age of 67 in Stockholm. She was buried at Norra begravningsplatsen in Solna.

Works
Munktell composed for orchestra but tended to vocal, choral and operatic works. Selected compositions include:
Violin Sonata opus 21 
In Florence, opera (1889)
Bränningar (Breaking Waves), Symphonic Poem (c. early 1890s) 
Suite for Large Orchestra (c. early 1890s) 
Valborgsmessoeld Poem Op.24 (1922) 
Suite dalécarlienne/Dalsuite (Dala Suite) Op.22 
Far on the solitary path, Text: Daniel Fallström
Isjungfrun (Polar Queen, "Over there in the blinding light"), ballad, text: Emma Josepha Sparre
May night Voices ("Hear how it calls us"), Text: Erik Axel Karlfeldt
Serenade ("You-rays up on the balcony"), Text: Daniel Fallström
Sleep, sleep ("Sleep, sleep, sleep calmly")
Magic Power ("Look not at me"), Text: Emma Josepha Sparre
Old coffee-o name-day show ("So have we")
Cantata for Women's Congress, 1897 ("Forward-walking") Text: H. Widmark
Song of the woods ("The tears stood bathed")

Her music has been recorded and issued on CD, including:Helena Munktell (1852-1919): Symphonic works'' (January 2005) STERLING CDS

References

Further reading

External links
Irene George sings Helena Munktells "Serenade" from YouTube
 

1852 births
1919 deaths
People from Dalarna
Royal College of Music, Stockholm alumni
19th-century classical composers
20th-century classical composers
Swedish music educators
Swedish classical composers
Women classical composers
Swedish women composers
19th-century Swedish musicians
Women music educators
Burials at Norra begravningsplatsen
19th-century Swedish women musicians
20th-century women composers
19th-century women composers
20th-century Swedish women